Philippe Fanoko Kossi Kpodzro (born 30 March 1930) is a Togolese Roman Catholic bishop. He was ordained as a priest on 20 December 1959 in Rome, later ordained as Bishop of Atakpamé on 2 May 1976. He was born in Tomégbé. He was Archbishop of Lomé between 17 December 1992  and 8 June 2007.

Kpodzro was the president of National Assembly of Togo from 1991 to 1994. In January 2020, he called for the suspension the February 22, 2020, presidential elections to pave the way for electoral reforms.

References

1930 births
Living people
Presidents of the National Assembly (Togo)
Togolese Roman Catholic bishops
Roman Catholic archbishops of Lomé
Roman Catholic bishops of Atakpamé
21st-century Togolese people